Marxism and the Oppression of Women: Toward a Unitary Theory (1983; revised edition 2013) is a book by the sociologist Lise Vogel that is considered an important contribution to Marxist Feminism. Vogel surveys Karl Marx and Friedrich Engels's comments on the causes of women's oppression, examines how socialist movements in Europe and in the United States have addressed women's oppression, and argues that women's oppression should be understood in terms of women's role in social reproduction and in particular in reproducing  labor power. 

Vogel writes: "This book constitutes an argument for the power of Marxism to analyze the issues that face women today in their struggle for liberation. It strongly rejects, however, the assumption made by many socialists that the classical-Marxist tradition bequeaths a more or less complete analysis of the problem of women's oppression."

The book received mixed reviews at the time of publication in 1983 but is now considered a founding text of Social Reproduction Theory.

Summary

Vogel examines the European and North American socialist movements' treatment of the "woman question." She examines what contemporary North American socialist feminist authors have said about women's oppression and how it is related (or not) to class society and the capitalist mode of production. She also discusses key debates within the North American feminist movement.

She argues that Marx's views on women's issues are inadequately under-developed, but that they contain insights that are useful for struggles against female oppression within capitalist class society and the capitalist mode of production. She argues that Marx's work on individual consumption, the value of labour-power and the industrial reserve army, provided a useful basis for further work on the issue of social reproduction. In contrast, Vogel finds Engels' work defective because of its utopianism and its reliance on a dual system theory of women's oppression vs. class oppression. She acknowledges, however, that the work of Engels was very influential in socialist debates despite its theoretical weaknesses. 

Vogel examines the socialist movement around the time of the Second International and the Russian Revolution in order to analyse what leading activists had to say. She critiques much of what was written as a conflation of utopianism, liberalism and dual systems theory. However, she does find that Vladimir Lenin's work and German SPD leader Clara Zetkin's work both represented much more pragmatic attempts to seriously address women's oppression and involvement in revolutionary activity. 

Vogel outlines two contradictory tendencies in the socialist debate about women's oppression - one which uses a dual systems analysis and the other which is rooted in social reproduction. She argues in favour of the social reproduction approach and elaborates her own theory of women's oppression from that perspective.

Publication history
The book was first published in the United States in 1983 by Rutgers University Press. It was published in the United Kingdom by Pluto Press. In 2013, the work was republished by Brill Publishers, with a new introduction by the political scientist David McNally and Susan Ferguson, and as part of the Historical Materialism Book Series.

Reception
Marxism and the Oppression of Women received mixed reviews from the sociologist Johanna Brenner in Contemporary Sociology, Gilda Zwerman in the American Journal of Sociology, Bonnie J. Fox in the Canadian Journal of Sociology, and Scarlet Pollock in the Canadian Review of Sociology & Anthropology. The book was also reviewed by Hester Eisenstein in Science & Society, Carol A. Brown in Qualitative Sociology, and Mary Margaret Fonow in Signs, and in Choice.

Brenner credited Vogel with providing a "clear and lively presentation" which demonstrated that "classical marxist theory grappled with key questions for today's feminists". However, she wrote that Vogel's analysis "remains at such a high level of abstraction and generality that it never quite addresses the central issues that socialist-feminist theory has been engaging for more than a decade", and criticized Vogel for failing to explain "why the outcome of this class struggle seems to be almost universally a family system in which men exercise power over women", and for her neglect of the work of the anarchist Emma Goldman and the Bolshevik Alexandra Kollontai. Zwerman considered Vogel's strategy for "demonstrating the power of Marxist theory" to be "interesting and intelligent". She credited Vogel with demonstrating that "those texts used most often by socialist feminists as representative of a Marxist perspective" are seriously flawed. However, she added that "there is far more to women's oppression than can be accounted for by their relationship to production" and wrote that Vogel "provides neither conceptual nor empirical tools for studying and understanding the significance of variations in women's domestic arrangements."

Fox credited Vogel with providing a "useful review of socialist analyses of women's subordinate position", and with showing that Lenin's analysis has not been substantially extended by subsequent socialist feminist writers, who unlike Lenin have neglected non-economic issues. However, she criticized Vogel for focusing on 19th-century theorists and ignoring more recent writers, and despite considering some of her ideas, such as those concerning women's child-bearing role, promising, found her attempt to provide "a theoretical framework for understanding women's oppression" unsuccessful because it ignored the radical feminist insight that "a theory of women's subordination must analyze the social relations between men and women (with their material base in sexual relations) which organize personal life." She criticized Vogel for failing to see the merits of views such as those of Nancy Chodorow, and wrote that her book was "discordant with the reality of North American women's daily lives" and "fails to touch on their dreams and visions for the future."

Pollock welcomed Vogel's attempt to rework Marxist theory, and her criticism of "the tendency in earlier work to analyze gender and class relations separately." However, she maintained that it left unresolved questions and problems, noting that while Vogel argued that, "Women's oppression is rooted in the function which their biology serves in terms of generational replacement in class relations", she was left with the need to "explain theoretically why the fact of different functions equals oppression" and also had to "find some way to account for the evidence of women's oppression prior to class-based societies as, theoretically, it has been made non-existent outside of the needs of the class struggle."

The 2016 edition of Marxism and the Oppression of Women received a positive review from Jessie Muldoon in International Socialist Review. She considered Vogel correct to acknowledge contributions made by Marx, Engels, August Bebel, Zetkin, and Lenin, though she considered it debatable whether Vogel was correct to make sharp distinctions between Marx's views and those of Engels. She credited Vogel with creating a framework to make possible a theory of women's oppression by developing the implications of partially developed insights elaborated by Marx in Das Kapital (1867–1883), thereby completing Marx's work in this field, with discrediting Mariarosa Dalla Costa's view that "domestic labor produces surplus value", and with demonstrating that "capital depends as much on reproduction as it does on production". She wrote that Vogel's "emphasis on material conditions and the biological differences between men and women ... may strike some readers as overly rigid" and dated, but she considered Vogel's "insistence on the material roots of both and the concomitant need for a united working-class force that can challenge both simultaneously" a "huge contribution to the building of a feminist movement rooted in Marxism" and concluded that Vogel's book "deserves to be recognized as a classic, indispensable companion to be read alongside Capital."

The political theorist Terrell Carver described Marxism and the Oppression of Women as a founding text of Marxist feminism.

McNally and Ferguson argued that the book had only a small number of supporters, due to being published at "a moment of acute disarray for the socialist-feminist movement", but that its originality prevented it from being forgotten completely. In their view, the book was "arguably the most sophisticated Marxist intervention in the theoretical debates thrown up by socialist feminism", and the contemporary "resurgence of anti-capitalist struggle" made its republication timely.

References

Bibliography
Books

 
 

Journals

External links
Lise Vogel: Marxism and the Oppression of Women. May 12, 2015, Cinema Europa, Zagreb, Croatia 8th Subversive Film Festival, "Spaces of Emancipation: Micropolitics and Rebellions." (Youtube) 
Review in International Socialism
Review in International Socialist Review

1983 non-fiction books
Books by Lise Vogel
English-language books
Feminist books
Marxist books
Marxist feminism
Rutgers University Press books